Stare Miasto means "Old Town" in Polish. It may refer to the following places:

City districts 

 Stare Miasto, Gdańsk
 Stare Miasto, Kraków (for the specific neighbourhood, see Kraków Old Town)
 Stare Miasto, Police
 Stare Miasto, Poznań (for the specific neighbourhood, see Poznań Old Town)
 Stare Miasto, Szczecin
 Stare Miasto, Warsaw
 Stare Miasto, Wrocław (for the specific neighbourhood, see Wrocław Old Town)
 Stare Miasto, Polish name for Staré Město (Třinec) in the Czech Republic

Villages 

 Stare Miasto, Konin County in Greater Poland Voivodeship (west-central Poland)
 Stare Miasto, Subcarpathian Voivodeship (south-east Poland)
 Stare Miasto, Szamotuły County in Greater Poland Voivodeship (west-central Poland)
 Stare Miasto, Pomeranian Voivodeship (north Poland)
 Stare Miasto, Warmian-Masurian Voivodeship (north Poland)

See also 

 Old Town (disambiguation)
 Nowe Miasto (disambiguation), meaning "new town"